Cat Phone is a range of toughened and strengthened mobile phones, including rugged smartphones developed, manufactured and sold by Bullitt Mobile Ltd, part of the British telecommunications and consumer electronics technology company Bullitt Group Ltd, under exclusive license from Caterpillar Inc. since 2012.

Carrying the CAT branding, the range includes standard feature phones, enhanced specification smartphones which operate on the Android operating system, and related accessories.

List of models

See also
TUFF Phones

References

External links

www.CatPhones.com — official website
Bullitt-Group.com — manufacturer official website

 
Caterpillar Inc.
Smartphones
Mobile phones